Tuomikoski is a Finnish surname. Notable people with the surname include:

Juho Tuomikoski (1888–1967), Finnish long-distance runner
Jukka Tuomikoski (1884–1956), Finnish painter and politician
Samuli Tuomikoski (1875–1960), Finnish farmer and politician

Finnish-language surnames